The O. V. Vijayan Sahitya Puraskaram or O. V. Vijayan Literary Award is instituted by the Naveena Samskarika Kala Kendram, Hyderabad, in memory of Malayalam novelist and cartoonist O. V. Vijayan who had spent his last days in Secunderabad. The award consists of a cash component of 50,001, a memento by Kanayi Kunhiraman, and a citation. The award is given to the best book in Malayalam language during the year.

Recipients

See also
 List of Malayalam literary awards

References

Indian literary awards
Malayalam literary awards
Awards established in 2011
2011 establishments in Andhra Pradesh